The John M. Wynne Unit (WY) is a men's prison of the Texas Department of Criminal Justice, located in northern Huntsville, Texas, at the intersection of Farm to Market Road 2821 West and Texas State Highway 75 North. The Windham School District has its headquarters in the unit. Wynne, the second oldest prison in Texas, was named after John Magruder Wynne, who served as a prison employee and later as a board member of the prison system from 1878 to 1881. The unit, on a  plot of land, is co-located with the Holliday Unit.

History

The State of Texas bought Wynne from the last lessees of the facility (Cunningham and Ellis) in 1883. The current unit was dedicated in 1937 and completed in 1939.

In the 1970s, the prison had 17 prison guards in its day shift to oversee 2,600 prisoners. The prison system arranged to have building tenders used to guard the prisoners, making up for the small number of prison guards.

On August 8, 2000, an inmate escaped from the prison by driving a tractor trailer cab through the prison wall while avoiding gunshots fired by correctional officers. The prisoner left the truck on the runway of Huntsville Airport and fled into a vehicle; state officials believed that the man's wife drove the vehicle. The state said that the offender "reportedly" was taken with force, while the wife surrendered peacefully.

In 2007 two inmates from Wynne escaped. During the incident the escape vehicle hit 59-year-old correctional officer Susan Canfield, killing her. Both inmates have been found and rearrested. The driver, Jerry Duane Martin (TDCJ#999552), was executed on December 3, 2013. The other inmate, John Ray Falk was sentenced to death in 2017.

In 2008 an Offender escaped the Wynne Unit using a child's bicycle. He was taken back into custody less than 24 hours later.

Operations
Wynne has a box factory, a computer recovery factory, and a license plate factory (the only one for the state and works with the 3M company). A mattress factory, which provides all of the beds for the state colleges, is at the Wynne Unit, as well as a mechanic shop with diesel repair, a signs and plastics plant, and a sticker plant. All of the state issued car registration stickers are also made at the Wynne Unit. It has been shown that the Wynne Unit generates around $1 Million a week for the State of Texas.  The Windham School District has its headquarters in Building B in the Wynne Unit.

Notable inmates
 David Ruiz (plaintiff of Ruiz v. Estelle)
 Fred Cruz (Petitioner Prisoner in Cruz v. Beto)
 David Crosby (member of Crosby, Stills, and Nash) was held for 5 months in the Wynne State Farm. "http://www.rockandrollroadmap.com/other-u.s.-area-misc/wynne-unit-david-crosby-imprisoned-here/view-details.html"
 Michael Morton - Later exonerated of the crime he was accused of.
 Keith Robert Turner - perpetrator of the 2006 Harris County, Texas hate crime assault

References

External links

 Wynne Unit - Texas Department of Criminal Justice
 List of prisoners in the Wynne Unit - The Texas Tribune

Prisons in Huntsville, Texas
1883 establishments in Texas
Buildings and structures in Walker County, Texas